Wondertwins or Wonder Twins or variant, may refer to:

 Wonder Twins, Zan and Jayna; a DC Comics superhero team
 The New Adventures of the Wonder Twins, webseries featuring the DC Comics pair
 The Fabulous Wonder Twins, Louis Alberto Campos and Carlos Eduardo Campos; a pair of Salvadoran fraternal twin brother celebrities
 The New Wondertwins, a stage act featuring Rebecca Finnegan and Susan Blackwell

See also
 Wonder (disambiguation)
 Twin (disambiguation)